South Carolina Highway 576 (SC 576) is a  primary state highway in the state of South Carolina. The highway connects U.S. Route 76 (US 76), west of Marion, to US 501, south-southeast of the city.

Route description
SC 576 serves to keep the continuation of the four-lane divided highway that travelers get on in Florence to Myrtle Beach and vice versa.

History
Established in 1973 as new primary routing, connecting US 76 and US 501 Business/SC 41 Alternate; it was built as a four-lane divided highway; it has remained unchanged since.

Junction list

See also

References

External links

 
 SC 576 at Virginia Highways' South Carolina Highways Annex

576
Transportation in Marion County, South Carolina